"Evolution" is the second EP by the South Korean boy band Infinite. The song "BTD (Before the Dawn)" was used to promote the EP. They released the song "Voice of My Heart" on December 29, 2010 as a teaser, and the full EP was released a week after, on January 6, 2011.

Controversy
During the promotions of the title track "BTD (Before the Dawn)", the music video of the song was considered to be controversial as it depicted violence.

Track listing

Charts

Sales and certifications 

Physical Sales

References

2011 EPs
Korean-language EPs
Infinite (group) EPs
Woollim Entertainment EPs